SBUDNIC was a 3U (one unit) CubeSat designed and built by an interdisciplinary group of undergraduate and graduate students at Brown University and the National Research Council of Italy, for research and educational purposes. The satellite was an open-source hardware project designed to be cheaply and easily reproduced, using commercial off-the-shelf parts like an Arduino Nano and AA Energizer batteries.

The project was financed by Brown's Undergraduate Finance Board, the National Research Council of Italy, and Rhode Island's NASA Space Grant Consortium. The satellite was deployed from D-Orbit's ION Satellite Carrier on the SpaceX Falcon 9 Transporter 5 mission.

References 

CubeSats
Brown University
Student satellites
Spacecraft launched in 2022
Spacecraft launched by Falcon rockets